Khan As'ad Pasha is the largest caravanserai in the Old City of Damascus, covering an area of . Situated along Al-Buzuriyah Souq, it was built and named after As'ad Pasha al-Azem, the governor of Damascus, in 1751–52. Khan As'ad Pasha has been described as one of the finest khans of Damascus, and the most "ambitious" work of architecture in the city. Throughout the Ottoman era, it hosted caravans coming from Baghdad, Mosul, Aleppo, Beirut and elsewhere in the Middle East.

Architecture

The restoration of the  won the Aga Khan Award for Architecture.

External Links 
See inside the place with a virtual tour from the ministry of tourism: https://syriatourism.org/Virtual_Tours/Khan%20Assad%20Basha/

Gallery

See also
Al-Azem Palace
Jaqmaq Caravansarai
Sulayman Pasha Caravansarai
Tuman Caravansarai

References

Bibliography

Caravanserais in Damascus
Ottoman caravanserais
Hotel buildings completed in 1752
Ottoman architecture in Damascus
Museums in Syria
Buildings and structures inside the walled city of Damascus
1750s establishments in Ottoman Syria
18th-century establishments in Ottoman Syria